Qiqushan Temple or Qiqu mountain Great temple. is a Taoist Temple in Zitong county of Mianyang City, in Sichuan Province, China. The Qiqushan Temple is located on a mountain about a few kilometers away from Zhangtong County, Mianyang City. It has a beautiful surrounding environment and is lined with trees. The ancient building complex of Qiqu Mountain Great Temple integrates the architecture of Yuan, Ming and Qing dynasties. There are 23 halls and attics, with a building area of 5,611 square meters and an area of 13,000 square meters. The Temple Architecture cleverly used the topography concept. The Temple itself was built on a hill, and were not bound by the tradition of parallel central axis, showing a flexible and natural style.  The entire temple is exquisitely designed, with stilts on the ridges, sloping corners and volleys. The layers of the pavilions are staggered, with unique carved beams and Building designs. There are both majestic palace-style buildings in the north and small and exquisite garden-style buildings in the south.

History
The large temple was built in Eastern Jin Dynasty. It was originally Named as "Yazi Temple", dedicated to Zhang Yazi In the early Yuan Dynasty, himself Zhang Yazi was named "Emperor Wenchang" and the temple was rebuilt as Wenchang Palace. There are more than 20,000 ancient cypresses next to the temple.

References

Buildings and structures in Sichuan
Zitong County